Chutine, originally Chutine Landing, is an abandoned locality and  is a former settlement at the confluence of the Chutine and Stikine Rivers in the Stikine Country of northwestern British Columbia, Canada.  The name "Chutine" means "half-people" in the Tahltan language, as the community here was a mixture of Tahltan and Tlingit peoples.

References

Populated places on the Stikine River
Stikine Country
Unincorporated settlements in British Columbia
Tahltan
Tlingit culture